Ministry of Defence Lyneham or MOD Lyneham is a Ministry of Defence site in Wiltshire, England, about  northeast of Chippenham and  southwest of Swindon. The site houses the Defence School of Electronic and Mechanical Engineering. Also here is Prince Philip Barracks, housing the regimental headquarters of the Royal Electrical and Mechanical Engineers (REME), 8 Training Battalion REME and the REME Museum.

Previously, the site was RAF Lyneham which closed on 31 December 2012.

History

RAF Lyneham

RAF Lyneham was built in 1939, necessitating the demolition of Lyneham Court manor house, the buildings of Cranley Farm and the village's tennis courts.  The airfield itself was initially a grass landing area although the RAF always planned to lay hard runways. Hangars and other buildings were dispersed around the site to avoid creating one large target for an aerial enemy.

The station was opened on 18 May 1940 as No. 33 Maintenance Unit (33MU), with no ceremony and few personnel. During the war the station's squadrons operated regular transport schedules to Gibraltar

With the increase in air transport operations in the RAF, as opposed to ferrying, Transport Command was formed in March 1943. Lyneham, in No. 46 Group RAF, was its main airfield in the south, and as well as sending its own aircraft overseas, acted as the clearance airfield for planning, diplomatic clearance, customs and briefing purposes for transport aeroplanes from other stations flying abroad.  It also provided facilities for aircraft being ferried overseas.

Lyneham's position as the primary tactical transport base for the RAF was emphasised in February 1971 when No. 30 Squadron RAF (30 Sqn) and No. 47 Squadron RAF (47 Sqn) were transferred from RAF Fairford, followed in September by No. 48 Squadron RAF (48 Sqn) from RAF Changi in Singapore.  This gave a total of five tactical Hercules squadrons at Lyneham, as well as the VIP transport Comet squadron, and in 1976, the station became the largest operational airfield in the RAF with the arrival from Cyprus of Hercules-equipped No. 70 Squadron RAF (LXX Sqn), bringing to seven the station's total of resident aircraft squadrons.

RAF Lyneham received the first of 25 brand-new Lockheed Martin C-130J Hercules on 23 November 1999, to be operated by XXIV Sqn and 30 Sqn.  The newer J model aircraft worked side by side with twenty-nine refurbished C-130K Hercules flown by 47 Sqn. LXX Sqn stood-down on 8 September 2010, but reformed in 2014, at Brize Norton, as the first Airbus A400M Atlas squadron, to be followed by 47 Sqn.

Closure of RAF station 
The decision to close RAF Lyneham was made in 2009, and it was scheduled for closure by 2012 with all functions and aircraft relocated to RAF Brize Norton. It was planned that the base would remain open until the last of the C-130K fleet was retired and the 24 new generation C-130Js would move to Brize Norton to join the transport and aerial refuelling fleets there.

It was announced in July 2011 by the then-Secretary of State for Defence, Dr Liam Fox, that Lyneham would become the new site of the Defence Technical Training Change Programme centre. This coincides with the closure of the Royal Electrical and Mechanical Engineers (REME) technical training establishments at Arborfield Garrison and Bordon Garrison, both of which moved to Lyneham by the end of 2015.

With the transfer of military units and personnel to Brize Norton complete, around 1,000 members of military and civilian staff remained on site, gradually reducing in numbers until RAF Lyneham closed entirely, on 31 December 2012. All military flying operations from RAF Lyneham ceased on 30 September 2011, at which point the station's air traffic control unit closed. Following the cessation of flights, the RAF Lyneham Flying Club moved to Cotswold Airport.

A stone memorial commemorating the RAF's use of the station for over 70 years was unveiled on 1 June 2012. All remaining RAF Lyneham personnel left the station by December 2012.

Transfer to defence training role

2011 plans 
As part of the Defence Technical Training Change Programme, part of the wider Defence Training Review, the MOD announced on 18 July 2011 that the Defence College of Technical Training (DCTT) would relocate to Lyneham. Plans called for the relocation of various British Army, Royal Navy and RAF training facilities to Lyneham, with the aim of modernising technical training and achieving efficiencies. Initially it was planned that the following training functions would relocate to Lyneham.

 Electronic and Mechanical Engineering – training for vehicle mechanics and marine engineers, recovery mechanics, armourers, metalsmiths, control equipment technicians and technical support specialists. As a result of the move to Lyneham, the army's Royal Electrical and Mechanical Engineers (REME) technical training establishments at Arborfield Garrison in Berkshire and Bordon Garrison in Hampshire, would both close.
 Aeronautical Engineering – training for avionics and aircraft technicians. Delivery of training would relocate from Arborfield Garrison, No. 1 School of Technical Training and the Aeronautical Engineering & Management Training School at RAF Cosford in Shropshire and the Royal Naval Air Engineering & Survival Equipment School at HMS Sultan. 
 Communications and Information Systems – field based tactical training and classroom/workshop based technical training, relocating from the Royal School of Signals at Blandford Camp in Dorset and No. 1 Radio School at RAF Cosford.

A planning application for the redevelopment of MOD Lyneham was submitted by the Defence Infrastructure Organisation to Wiltshire Council in May 2013 Planning permission was granted in October 2013 for the re-development of the station including the demolition of several existing structures and the construction of new and refurbished buildings to accommodate single living accommodation, dining, mess and welfare facilities, workshops, teaching accommodation and classrooms, offices, stores, medical and dental centre, church, museum, physical and recreational training centre, the creation of outdoor training areas including ground works and ground level alterations, the erection of masts, towers and radars, a forward operating base training facility, obstacle course, assault course, firing range, sports pitches, new roads, footpaths, parking, hard and soft landscaping, lighting, balancing ponds, and access alterations including a new roundabout and ancillary works.

The demolition of some unsafe and redundant buildings commenced in early 2013. The re-development was planned to be undertaken in a series of phases, construction beginning in 2014 and completing in December 2015, with the first units arriving and the start of training taking place in 2016. Further units would arrive in subsequent years with the programme being complete in 2019. The contract for the first phase was valued at between £180m and £230m. 

In December 2013, a £121m contract for the first phase of work was awarded to Hercules, a 50:50 joint-venture between Kier Group and Balfour Beatty. Construction work commenced in February 2014. Babcock's Defence and Security Division were awarded a contract in August 2014 to supply and support REME training at Lyneham, with a full operating capability programmed for February 2016.

2015 re-evaluation 
Michael Fallon, Secretary of State for Defence, announced in September 2015 that the relocation of the RAF and Royal Navy training elements to Lyneham would no longer take place. A re-evaluation of the programme determined that the consolidation onto a single site was no longer the best option. The first phase, the relocation of the REME schools from Arborfield and Bordon would still proceed.

REME training at Arborfield and Bordon transferred to Lyneham in September 2015, and was due to begin at Lyneham by November of that year. The School of Army Aeronautical Engineering (SAAE), which moved from Arborfield, started training in October 2015.

The new regimental headquarters of the REME was officially opened on 11 March 2016 by Prince Philip, Duke of Edinburgh and given the name The Prince Philip Barracks.

Role and operations

Defence School of Electronic and Mechanical Engineering 
Lyneham is home to the Defence School of Electronic and Mechanical Engineering (DSEME), part of the Defence College of Technical Training (DCTT) within No. 22 Group RAF. The school trains current and future Royal Electrical and Mechanical Engineers (REME) technicians.

Royal Electrical and Mechanical Engineers
The REME Museum, previously based in Arborfield, Berkshire, moved into the former Officers' Mess in 2015. The move provided an opportunity to refresh the displays and layout as well as provide new facilities such as a café, archives and a reading/conference room. There are dedicated education facilities to cater for groups of all ages and interests. The new museum opened to the public in June 2017.

The Royal Electrical and Mechanical Engineers also have their corps headquarters on the camp.

Based units 
The following notable units are based at MOD Lyneham.

Royal Air Force 

 Headquarters Defence College of Technical Training (DCTT) – under No. 22 Group

British Army 

 Defence School of Electronic and Mechanical Engineering (DSEME)
8 Training Battalion, Royal Electrical and Mechanical Engineers
REME Arms School
School of Army Aeronautical Engineering (SAAE)

Royal Electrical and Mechanical Engineers (REME)

 Regimental Headquarters Royal Electrical and Mechanical Engineers
 5 Force Support Battalion
 REME Museum

Civilian 

 Babcock Defence Support Group

See also

 Units of the Royal Electrical and Mechanical Engineers

References

Bibliography

External links 

REME Museum

Installations of the Ministry of Defence (United Kingdom)
2012 establishments in the United Kingdom
Buildings and structures in Wiltshire